J. Michael Eakin (born 1948) is an American lawyer, who served as a Justice of the Supreme Court of the Commonwealth of Pennsylvania.  He was elected to the State's Supreme Court in 2001 as a Republican. In November 2011, Justice Eakin won judicial retention in a statewide election for his second 10-year term with 73.6% of the popular vote. In response to an ethics investigation, he made his resignation public on March 15, 2016.

Early life and career

Justice Eakin was born in Mechanicsburg, Pennsylvania in 1948. He graduated from Franklin and Marshall College in 1970 with a Bachelor of Arts (BA) in Government and obtained his Juris Doctor (JD) degree from The Dickinson School of Law in 1975. In 2005 he was awarded an honorary Doctorate of Laws from Widener University in Chester, Pennsylvania. He served in Pennsylvania's Army National Guard, 28th Division, from 1971-1977. After graduating from law school in 1975 and until 1983, he served as an Assistant District Attorney for Cumberland County, Pennsylvania. In 1984 he became the District Attorney for Cumberland County, PA, a position he held until 1995 when he was elected as a Judge for the Superior Court of Pennsylvania. This is a position he held until 2001 when he was elected to a 10-year term on the state's Supreme Court. He is currently married to Heidi Eakin and has three sons, Michael, Zachary and Chase.

In 2001, he was named runner up "Politician of the Year" by PoliticsPA.

Rhyming opinions
Justice Eakin is better known in legal circles for the unorthodox way he pens his opinions. He enjoys writing his opinions in poetic verse when as he has stated, "The subject of the case (…) call[s] for a little grin here or there." For this, he has joined a long list of Justices and Judges who have been heavily criticized for bringing literary insight into what has traditionally been considered as boring and straight forward judicial decision making.

An example of the types of judicial lyricism that Justice Eakin is known for is this rhyme he wrote regarding a premarital contract gone wrong:

Another example of his verse would be this rhyme he wrote regarding a contract dispute:

Perhaps his most currently commented opinion is his dissent on Noel v. Travis, where he disagreed with the majority who found that the appellant was in fact not guilty of a DUI after being found riding his horse while intoxicated. Justice Eakin wrote (in part):

Due to the unorthodox way Justice Eakin pens his opinions, he has been criticized by his fellow Justices. In the 2002 New York Times article "Justices Call on Bench's Bard to Limit his Lyricism", Chief Justice Stephen A. Zappala was quoted as writing that "An opinion that expresses itself in rhyme reflects poorly on the Supreme Court of Pennsylvania." Justice Ralph J. Cappy was also quoted as stating that "Every jurist has the right to express him or herself in a manner the jurist deems appropriate, [but I am concerned about] the perception that litigants and the public at large might form when an opinion of the court is reduced to rhyme." However, Justice Eakin has justified his so-called "poetic justice" by stating that "[Y]ou have an obligation as a judge to be right, but you have no obligation to be dull."

Presentations

On July 7, 2007, Justice Eakin and Attorney Matthew A. Cartwright, of Munley, Munley and Cartwright, presented "Ethics Issues for Trial Lawyers" to the Pennsylvania Trial Lawyers Annual Convention in Hershey, Pennsylvania.

On March 23, 2015, Justice Eakin gave a presentation entitled "The Piano Man as Judge, Juror and Prosecutor" as part of the Touro College of Law conference, "Billy Joel & The Law."

Controversy

In 2015, racist and misogynist emails Eakin received have been released by Kathleen Kane in her dispute with the judicial system.  Only four emails were forwarded by Eakin.  They were examined by the  Judicial Conduct Board.

Justice Eakin resigned on March 15, 2016.

References

External links
 Official Supreme Court Profile
 Eakin Profile from Judgepedia.

1948 births
Living people
Dickinson School of Law alumni
County district attorneys in Pennsylvania
Franklin & Marshall College alumni
People from Mechanicsburg, Pennsylvania
Justices of the Supreme Court of Pennsylvania